The Zapata Swamp is located on the Zapata Peninsula in the southern Matanzas Province of Cuba, in the municipality of Ciénaga de Zapata.

Species and preservation
Within the Zapata Swamp are over 900 autochthonous plant species, 175 species of birds, 31 species of reptiles and over 1000 species of invertebrates. Some of the most notable are local endemics to Cuba; for birds, it includes the Zapata wren, Zapata rail, and the Zapata sparrow. The Zapata Swamp is also a particular habitat of the bee hummingbird, the smallest bird species on the planet.  The Zapata Swamp is also visited by 65 species of birds during their migration pattern from North America through the Caribbean to South America. Zapata is also known for the local endemic Cuban crocodile (Crocodylus rhombifer) which are restricted to the Zapata Swamp and are being reintroduced to the nearby Lanier Swamp on the Isle of Youth. The sympatric American crocodile (Crocodylus acutus) also occurs within the Zapata Swamp, and hybridisation between the two species takes place, confirmed by the existence of a Cuban-American hybrid which was found on the Yucatán Peninsula in Mexico after migrating from the swamp.

Within the Zapata Swamp are numerous areas designated for environmental preservation, such as Zapata Swamp Natural Reserve and Las Salinas wildlife sanctuary, which is part of the larger Ciénaga de Zapata Biosphere Reserve (IUCN category VI) which in total is over 6,000 km² and the largest protected area, not only in Cuba, but also the Caribbean. The swamp is not only known for its size but also for being the best preserved wetlands in all of the Antilles, designated as a "Wetland of International Importance" by the Ramsar Convention on Wetlands in 1971. In mid-2001 an additional 4,520 km² were declared a Ramsar Site in mid-2001.

Geography
The Zapata Swamp lies between 22°01’ and 22°40’ N latitude and between 80°33’ and 82°09’ W longitude. The swamp in total is over one million acres (4,000 km²). Topographically, the maximum height above sea level is only about 10 meters with the top depth in below-sea-level coastal zones as follows: 2 meters in the salt-marsh area and from 1–600 meters in the sea coastal zone.

Gallery

See also

Ernst Thälmann Island
Geography of Cuba
Protected area
Ramsar Convention
World Conservation Monitoring Centre

References

Sources

External links

 cubatechtravel.com, Areas of Natural Interes, Beaches, Nature Trails

Biosphere reserves of Cuba
Ramsar sites in Cuba
Wetlands of Cuba
Swamps of North America
Geography of Matanzas Province
Tourist attractions in Matanzas Province